Bibb County School District may refer to:

 Bibb County School District (Alabama)
 Bibb County School District (Georgia)